Hans Hyldbakk (8 May 1898 – 18 August 2001) was a Norwegian poet and historian.

He was born and died in Surnadal. As a writer he is best known for the song Vårsøg. His poetry debut came in 1929 with  Harpespel, and his last issue was 1998's Lauvfall.

References

1898 births
2001 deaths
20th-century Norwegian poets
Norwegian male poets
Norwegian centenarians
People from Møre og Romsdal
20th-century Norwegian male writers
People from Surnadal
Men centenarians